Perrottetia alpestris subsp. philippinensis is a subspecies of Perrottetia alpestris. It is a plant in the family Dipentodontaceae, sometimes classified in the family Celastraceae.

Description
The twigs are purplish when fresh, drying black. The flowers are white or light greenish.

Distribution and habitat
Perrottetia alpestris subsp. philippinensis grows naturally in Borneo, the Philippines and Sulawesi. Its habitat is hill and montane forests to  altitude.

References

alpestris subsp. philippinensis
Flora of Borneo
Flora of the Philippines
Flora of Sulawesi
Plant subspecies